Stefan Pohl (born 10 April 1978, in Merseburg) is a German former swimmer who competed in the 2000 Summer Olympics.

References

1978 births
Living people
German male swimmers
German male freestyle swimmers
Olympic swimmers of Germany
Swimmers at the 2000 Summer Olympics
European Aquatics Championships medalists in swimming
People from Merseburg
Sportspeople from Saxony-Anhalt